The Peninsula may refer to:

Places

United Kingdom 
The Peninsula, Durham, the historic centre of Durham, England

United States 
The Peninsula at St. Johns Center, a building in Jacksonville, Florida
The San Francisco Peninsula, in Northern California
The Monterey Peninsula, in Central California
The Virginia Peninsula, of southeastern Virginia

Hotel
The Peninsula Hotels, a chain of luxury hotels founded in 1928
The Peninsula Hong Kong
The Peninsula New York
The Peninsula Beijing
The Peninsula Manila
The Peninsula Bangkok
The Peninsula Tokyo
The Peninsula Paris

Newspaper
The Peninsula (newspaper), daily English language newspaper published in Qatar

See also
Peninsula (disambiguation)